Edwin Sherrill Dodge (1874–1938) was an American architect.

Personal background 
Dodge was born into a wealthy family of Newburyport, Massachusetts, the son of the manufacturer Elisha Perkins Dodge. He trained as an architect at MIT, graduating in 1897. In 1902, he graduated from the École nationale supérieure des Beaux-Arts in Paris.

In November 1904, Dodge married art patron and writer Mabel Dodge Luhan, then known as Mable Ganson Evans. Their unconventional marriage is described in her autobiographies Intimate Memories and European Experiences. The couple also appear in The Autobiography of Alice B. Toklas.

In Arcetri, near Florence, they lived in the palatial Villa Curonia and undertook extensive, expensive renovations that consumed their incomes for years; the house "drank money". They continued to live together, more or less, in Florence until 1911, when Dodge returned to the U.S. and established architectural offices in New York and Boston. After a long separation and scandal, their divorce was finalized in June 1916.

Professional background 
In 1914, Dodge partnered with John Worthington Ames (1871–1954), who had trained at Harvard and at the École des Beaux-Arts. Together, they formed the architectural firm of Ames & Dodge.

Dodge's architectural designs include:

 Newburyport High School, Newburyport, Massachusetts, circa 1937
 Ellen T. Brown Memorial Chapel, Oak Hill Cemetery, Newburyport, Massachusetts, 1914
 Edwin Booth Memorial, with sculptor Edmond Thomas Quinn, Gramercy Park, New York City, 1918
 Hartford Fire Insurance Company Building, Asylum Hill, Hartford, Connecticut, 1921
 multiple buildings in the quadrangle at Smith College, as Ames, Dodge & Putnam, 1922–1936
 Cabot Hall at Cabot House, now part of Harvard University, Cambridge, Massachusetts, 1936
 Lotta Fountain, Charles River Esplanade, Boston, Massachusetts, with sculptor Katherine Lane Weems, 1939
 Bennington Commons and the 12 original student houses,  Bennington College, Bennington, Vermont, 1931 - 1937

References 

1874 births
1938 deaths
20th-century American architects
American alumni of the École des Beaux-Arts
People from Newburyport, Massachusetts
Architects from Massachusetts
Architects from Boston
Massachusetts Institute of Technology alumni